German Township is one of twelve townships in Bartholomew County, Indiana, United States. As of the 2010 census, its population was 7,093 and it contained 2,920 housing units.

History
The James Marr House and Farm and Pugh Ford Bridge are listed on the National Register of Historic Places.

Geography
Camp Atterbury borders the township to the west.

Cities, towns, villages
 Columbus (north edge)
 Edinburgh (south quarter)
 Taylorsville

Unincorporated towns

 North Gate
 Pleasant View Village
(This list is based on USGS data and may include former settlements.)

Adjacent townships
 Jackson Township, Shelby County (northeast)
 Washington Township, Shelby County (northeast)
 Flat Rock Township (east)
 Columbus Township (south)
 Blue River Township, Johnson County (northwest)

Cemeteries
The township contains these three cemeteries: Steenbarger, Tannehill and Treadway.

Major highways
  Interstate 65
  U.S. Route 31

School districts
 Bartholomew County School Corporation

Political districts
 Indiana's 6th congressional district
 State House District 59
 State Senate District 41

References

Citations

Sources
 United States Census Bureau 2007 TIGER/Line Shapefiles
 United States Board on Geographic Names (GNIS)
 United States National Atlas

External links

 Indiana Township Association
 United Township Association of Indiana

Townships in Bartholomew County, Indiana
Townships in Indiana